Rotterdam Zuid is a railway station in the city of Rotterdam in the Netherlands, located on the Breda–Rotterdam railway between Rotterdam and Dordrecht. It is situated at the end of the Willemsspoortunnel in the borough of Feijenoord.

History
Rotterdam Zuid was first opened on 2 May 1877 as a station on the Breda–Rotterdam railway (Staatslijn I). To the north was the Hefbrug, connecting the railtracks from the north and the south of Rotterdam, and to the south was Barendrecht. The area around the station was less developed than today. It was a simple station, without a building and with 2 platforms. After World War II, the reconstruction of the railroad tracks in and around Rotterdam began. In 1958, Rotterdam Zuid was renovated and had gained a small building.

The station remained that way until the next reconstruction in 1993, when a tunnel was built to replace the flyover at Blaak and the bridges over the Meuse. The station was given a total makeover.
The number of tracks between Rotterdam and Dordrecht was being expanded from 2 to 4, giving the station 4 platform tracks. To reach all of the platforms, a traverse was built over the station, which connected the Rosestraat and the Oranjeboomstraat.

Train services
The following services call at Rotterdam Blaak:
2x per hour local service (sprinter) The Hague - Rotterdam - Dordrecht - Breda
2x per hour local service (sprinter) The Hague - Rotterdam - Dordrecht - Roosendaal

Bus and tram services
Rotterdam Zuid is a stop for the following Bus lines on the RET network.

At night, Rotterdam Zuid is connected by the Bob bus, operated by RET. Bob is a drink or drive campaign.

References

External links
NS website 
Dutch Public Transport journey planner 

Railway tunnels in the Netherlands
Zuid
Railway stations opened in 1877
1877 establishments in the Netherlands
Railway stations in the Netherlands opened in the 19th century